District 2 of the Oregon State Senate comprises eastern Josephine County and central-west Jackson County. It is currently represented by Republican Art Robinson of Cave Junction.

Election results
District boundaries have changed over time, therefore, senators before 2013 may not represent the same constituency as today. From 1993 until 2003, the district covered part of the central Oregon Coast and Yamhill County, and from 2003 until 2013 it covered a slightly different area in southern Oregon.

References

02
Jackson County, Oregon
Josephine County, Oregon